Ciso may refer to:

People
 Ciso Morales, Filipino boxer
 Ciso Bernardo, Filipino basketball player

Other
 CISO-FM, Canadian radio station
 Chief information security officer
 Ciso (comics), a Flemish comics magazine that originated the Bronzen Adhemar prize